Angela Kalule is a Ugandan musician and radio presenter. She won 'Song of the year' and 'Best Live Band Single' in the 2011 Pearl of Africa Music Awards.

Background
Angela Kalule was born on 18 February 1977 in Kampala, Uganda. She went to Aga Khan nursery Nairobi Kenya, Nakasero SS from 1992 to 1993 and Mengo Senior School. She holds a bachelor's degree in Information Management.

Music
She started singing in school and joined  the music industry in 1997 as a backup vocalist for Diamond Ensemble group. It is there that she released her first ‘Akamuli’. In 2006, she released a six-track solo album, with two songs in English and four in Luganda. She currently sings in her own band, the K’angie band.

Discography

Songs
Kankwekumire
Katikitiki
Kantuntunu
Highway
olimi Ssukkali

Albums
Dark Chocolate
Kakondo

Awards and recognition
Song of the year in the Pearl of Africa Music Awards 2011 for "Katikitiki" 
Best live band single in the Pearl of Africa Music Awards 2011 for "Katikitiki"

References 

1977 births
Musicians from Kampala
21st-century Ugandan women singers
Living people